The Parting Song (Greek:To tragoudi tou horismou) is a 1939 Greek drama film directed by Filopimin Finos and starring Evgenia Danika, Labros Konstadaras and Linda Miranda. It was the only film directed by Finos, better-known for running the production company Finos Films. The film was long thought to be lost after it was destroyed by the Germans during the Occupation of Greece, but a fragmented copy was discovered in Egypt.

The film is notable as the first Greek film to be processed in a Greek technical laboratory (previous films had been processed abroad) which had been built by Finos Films. The film was a commercial failure on its release, and met a hostile reception from critics.

Synopsis
While holidaying on the island of Hydra, a wealthy Athenian woman meets and falls in love with a local fisherman. She seduces him away from his girlfriend and takes him with her to the city to pursue a career as a singer. Despite enjoying success, he decides that city life is not for him and returns to his home and his previous girlfriend who really loves him.

Cast
 Evgenia Danika as Miranda 
 Labros Konstadaras as Konstadis  
 Linda Miranda as Zoitsa 
 Petros Epitropakis as Konstadis 
 Giorgos Anaktoridis
 Maria Benipsalti 
 Alekos Livaditis as Zarganas
 Mimis Moshoutis 
 Nana Papadopoulou 
 Kostas Papageorgiou

References

Bibliography 
 Petrakis, Marina. The Metaxas Myth: Dictatorship and Propaganda in Greece. I.B.Tauris, 2011.

External links 

1939 films
Greek drama films
1939 drama films
Greek-language films
Films set in Athens
Films set in Greece
Finos Film films
Greek black-and-white films